Christine Joy Pfitzinger (née Hughes; born 24 January 1959) is a former New Zealand female middle-distance runner. She represented New Zealand at the 1988 Summer Olympics, where she competed in the 3000 metres. She won nine New Zealand national athletic championship titles: the 800 metres in 1982 and 1987; the 1500 metres in 1986, 1987, 1990 and 1999; and the 3000 metres in 1984, 1988 and 1990.

Her husband, Pete Pfitzinger, is a former American marathon runner who represented the United States at the 1984 and 1988 Summer Olympics.

References

External links 
 
 

1959 births
Living people
New Zealand female middle-distance runners
Athletes (track and field) at the 1988 Summer Olympics
Athletes (track and field) at the 1986 Commonwealth Games
Athletes (track and field) at the 1990 Commonwealth Games
Olympic athletes of New Zealand
Sportspeople from Waikato
Commonwealth Games competitors for New Zealand